Master of Business Systems (MBS) is a Postgraduate/Master's degree in Business Systems.

Business Systems programs combine Information Technology (IT) and Business/Management courses and are common in Australia.

Australian universities, like most in the UK education systems, pay more attention on how IT would help the business and financial process online, rather than how IT would be the product itself in conceptualization to be sold as most institutions do in South Korea, Japan and the US. However, for international students interested to enter IT, it would be a good choice of kick-start.

Typical areas of study

Basic Technology:

Courses may include topics like applied computer science, computer networks and Internet technology, website engineering, web designing, programming, or information security.

Business Informatics Methods:

Courses may focus on information systems development, database management, information systems architectures, business intelligence, or business process modelling.

Management:

Management oriented topics may be studied in courses on management information systems, information management, management control, database management, risk management, neural networks, project management, knowledge management, management and organization of IT departments, or software engineering management etc.

Applications:

Important application domains of Business Systems may be investigated in courses like enterprise resource planning, E-Commerce, SAP and e-business networking, industrial information systems, or electronic finance/electronic banking, web security, simulation models etc.

References

 
Master of Technology （Business System）of Swinburne university.（now incorporated as Master of Business Information System ）

Business Administration, Master
Business qualifications
Information systems